East Tawakoni is a city in Rains County, Texas, United States. The population was 883 at the 2010 census. East Tawakoni is located on the east side of Lake Tawakoni, while its twin city West Tawakoni is located on the west side of the lake.

History

Marketed as a relaxed rural community with easy access to Dallas, East Tawakoni was established on June 6, 1967 after an election in which 30 of 45 residents voted in favor of incorporation. A mayor (Grady A. Whitehead) and five aldermen (Raymond Briggs, A.L. Williams, D.A. "Doc" Vincent, A.O. Murphrey, and T.E. Bell) were elected on June 27, 1967. In a local option election held on February 6, 1968, residents voted 38–32 (54.3%–45.7%) in favor of selling alcoholic beverages. The move ended more than 60 years of Rains County being wholly "dry". East Tawakoni had a population of 278 in 1970. That same year, a fire destroyed the city hall building and all of its records. City officials met in the garage of a local resident until a new building was constructed. The annexation of the Blue Heron Cove subdivision in 1986 doubled the size of East Tawakoni. By 1990, the city was home to 542 people. The population grew to 775 in 2000, a 43 percent increase over the 1990 figure.

Geography

East Tawakoni is located at  (32.902922, –95.944247), along State Highway 276 in western Rains County. It is situated on the eastern shore of Lake Tawakoni, nine miles west of Emory.

Demographics

As of the 2020 United States census, there were 824 people, 305 households, and 183 families residing in the city.

Education
The City of East Tawakoni is served by the Rains Independent School District.

References

Cities in Texas
Cities in Rains County, Texas